The Chief Opposition Whip is a position in the Parliament of Sri Lanka.

List of Chief Opposition Whips

Parties

See also
Parliament of Sri Lanka
Cabinet of Sri Lanka

References

External links
Parliament of Sri Lanka - Handbook of Parliament, 

Parliament of Sri Lanka
 Chief Opposition Whips
Sri Lanka